Jørgen Hansen may refer to:

 Jørgen Hansen (footballer) (born 1931), Danish footballer; silver medalist at the 1960 Summer Olympics
 Jørgen Hansen (skier), Norwegian skier
 Jørgen Hansen (cyclist) (born 1942), Danish cyclist
 Svend Jørgen Hansen (born 1922), Danish footballer; played two games for the Danish national team, see Odense Boldklub
 Jørgen W. Hansen (born 1925), Danish footballer; competed at the 1948 (bronze medalist) and 1952 Summer Olympics, see Denmark at the 1952 Summer Olympics
 Jens Jørgen Hansen (born 1939), Danish footballer; competed at the 1964 European Championship
 Jørgen Hansen (rower) (1890–1953), Danish rower
 Jørgen Hansen (boxer) (1943–2018), Danish boxer
 Jørgen Hammergaard Hansen (1930s–2013), Danish badminton player
 Jørgen Robert Hansen (1911–1991), Danish field hockey player
 Jørgen Peder Hansen (1923–1994), Danish politician and minister